Cachapoal (Fertile valley in Mapudungun), is a village located in the municipality of San Carlos, in Ñuble Region, Chile.

It is located 20 km east of San Carlos and 22 km west of San Fabián on Route N-31, has 1164 inhabitants (2002).

Some descendants of the famous nineteenth-century cattle rustlers, the Pincheira brothers, live in this village. There are also some speakers of Mapudungun.

See also
 List of towns in Chile

External links 
 Satellite Image (Google Maps)

Populated places in Punilla Province